Justice Elio Smith (born August 9, 1995) is an American actor. He is best known for his roles in the films Jurassic World: Fallen Kingdom, Pokémon: Detective Pikachu, and All the Bright Places.

Early life 
Smith was born in California. Smith graduated from the Orange County School of the Arts in 2013 and has performed in shows around Orange County.

Career 
In 2014, Smith appeared in Nickelodeon's superhero comedy series The Thundermans, playing Angus in two episodes. He also appeared in the HBO's documentary series Masterclass and some VlogBrothers videos. In 2015, Smith had a supporting role as Marcus "Radar" Lincoln in Paper Towns. The film was directed by Jake Schreier and released on July 24, 2015, by 20th Century Fox. In 2016, Smith broke out in the lead role of Ezekiel Figuero in Netflix's musical drama series The Get Down, during which Smith employed the technique known as method acting by taking up residence in a dilapidated Bronx apartment. The Get Down premiered in August 2016 and concluded in April 2017, being cancelled shortly thereafter.

In 2017, Smith was on Forbes 30 under 30 List. Smith also appeared in New York, opposite Lucas Hedges, in the Off-Broadway stage production of Yen by playwright Anna Jordan. The production ran at the Lucille Lortel Theater starting January 2017 and closed on March 4, 2017. In February 2018, Smith co-starred in Every Day as Justin, the boyfriend of lead character Rhiannon. A few months later, in June 2018, he portrayed Franklin Webb in Jurassic World: Fallen Kingdom, which turned out to be his first big breakthrough.

Smith starred in the 2019 blockbuster Pokémon Detective Pikachu, a live-action film based on the video game of the same name. He starred alongside Elle Fanning in All the Bright Places, directed by Brett Haley from a screenplay by Liz Hannah and Jennifer Niven, the latter of whom authored the novel upon which the film is based. Filming commenced in the fall of 2018.

In 2020, Justice Smith participated in Acting for a Cause, a live classic play and screenplay reading series created, directed and produced by Brando Crawford. Smith played Jack in The Importance of Being Earnest by Oscar Wilde and Dennis Ziegler in This is Our Youth by Kenneth Lonergan. The reading raised funds for non-profit charities including Mount Sinai Medical Center.

Personal life
Smith came out as queer in an Instagram post on June 5, 2020, and said he is in a romantic relationship with actor Nicholas L. Ashe.

He mentioned in a behind the scenes video of Detective Pikachu that he is a Pokémon fan, and still has the first-generation Pokémon Trading Cards.

Filmography

Film

Television

Theatre

Video games

Awards and nominations

References

External links 
 
 
 

1995 births
21st-century American male actors
African-American male actors
American male film actors
American male television actors
LGBT African Americans
LGBT male actors
LGBT people from California
Living people
Male actors from Los Angeles
Orange County School of the Arts alumni
Queer actors
Queer men
American LGBT actors
21st-century African-American people